Scopula plionocentra is a moth of the  family Geometridae. It is found in Cameroon, the Democratic Republic of Congo, Gabon, Nigeria and Uganda.

References

Moths described in 1920
plionocentra
Insects of West Africa
Insects of Uganda
Fauna of Gabon
Moths of Africa